The monobromophenols are chemical compounds consisting of phenol substituted with a bromine atom.  There are three isomers, 2-bromophenol, 3-bromophenol, and 4-bromophenol.

See also
 Bromophenol
 Monochlorophenol

References

Bromoarenes
Phenols